Kinji (written: 欣二, 欽治, 錦司 or キンジ in katakana) is a masculine Japanese given name. Notable people with the name include:

Kinji Akagawa (born 1940), American sculptor
 (1930–2003), Japanese actor, screenwriter and film director
 (1902–1992), Japanese scientist
 (1921–2010), American professional wrestler and actor
 (born 1953), Japanese badminton player

Japanese masculine given names